Fettelite, also known as sanguinite, is a mercury-sulfosalt mineral with the chemical formula Ag16HgAs4S15. The mineral was first described by Wang and Paniagua (1996) who named it after M. Fettel, a German field geologist who collected the first samples from Odenwald. It was first collected in the Nieder-Beerbach mine, 10 km south of Darmstadt, Odenwald, Germany. Its normal occurrence is in hydrothermal veins, which can cut gabbro-diorite intrusives. It is closely related to other rare minerals like dervillite, daomanite, vaughanite and criddleite which are also found in the same type locality as fettelite.

Fettelite occurs as clusters of hexagonal flakes. These flakes can get up to 0.2 mm across and around 5-10 µm thick. In more complex hexagonal tablets, somewhat larger sub parallel aggregates can be measured.  The birefringence of Fettelite is moderate white to grayish brown.

References

Arsenic minerals
Mercury(II) minerals
Silver minerals
Sulfosalt minerals
Monoclinic minerals
Minerals in space group 5
Minerals described in 1996